Rozsi Karpati was a female Hungarian international table tennis player.

She won eight World Table Tennis Championship medals from the 1947 World Table Tennis Championships to the 1951 World Table Tennis Championships.

See also
 List of table tennis players
 List of World Table Tennis Championships medalists

References

Hungarian female table tennis players
World Table Tennis Championships medalists